Hedyotis indirae is a species of flowering plant in the coffee family Rubiaceae that is endemic to Western Ghats in India. It is a new shrubby species of Rubiaceae from Muthikulam forest of Palakkad district in Kerala.

References

indirae
Flora of Kerala